Thunder and Lightning (Swedish: Blixt och dunder) is a 1938 Swedish comedy film directed by Anders Henrikson and starring Olof Winnerstrand, Nils Wahlbom and Frida Winnerstrand. It is an adaptation of the 1929 novel Summer Lightning by P.G. Wodehouse. The film's art direction was by Arne Åkermark.

Cast
 Olof Winnerstrand as Magnus Gabriel Hägerskiöld  
 Nils Wahlbom as Pontus Hägerskiöld 
 Frida Winnerstrand as Charlotta Hägerskiöld  
 Åke Söderblom as Claes-Ferdinande Hägerskiöld  
 Marianne Aminoff as Inga 
 Hasse Ekman as Bertil Bendix  
 Sickan Carlsson as Pyret Hanson  
 Eric Abrahamsson as Head Waiter Härman  
 Torsten Winge as Axel Hjalmar Stencloo 
 Weyler Hildebrand as Charlie Blomberg 
 Alice Babs as Flower Girl  
 Julia Cæsar as Telegraph operator  
 Emil Fjellström as Andersson 
 Nils Dahlgren as Head waiter at Savoy  
 David Erikson as Driver 
 Georg Fernqvist as Waiter at Savoy  
 Åke Grönberg as Chucker-out  
 Eivor Landström as Guest at Savoy  
 Otto Malmberg as Adolf

References

Bibliography
 Qvist, Per Olov & von Bagh, Peter. Guide to the Cinema of Sweden and Finland. Greenwood Publishing Group, 2000.

External links

1938 films
Swedish comedy films
Swedish black-and-white films
1938 comedy films
1930s Swedish-language films
Films directed by Anders Henrikson
Films based on works by P. G. Wodehouse
Films based on British novels
Films set in London
1930s Swedish films